The 2015 British Figure Skating Championships were held on 26–30 November 2014 in Sheffield. Medals were awarded in the disciplines of men's singles, ladies' singles, pair skating, and ice dancing on the senior, junior, and novice levels. The results were among the criteria used to determine international assignments.

Medalists

Senior

Junior

Advanced novice

Basic novice

References

External links
 British Championships at the National Ice Skating Association

British Figure Skating Championships, 2015
British Figure Skating Championships
Figure Skating Championships